Dekoor Close Harmony (1985) is a choir of 30 students of the Utrecht University in the Netherlands. Conducted by Christoph Mac-Carty, the choir brings a mix of jazz, gospel and pop to the stage, while occasionally experimenting with classical and world music as well. The choir mainly sings a cappella or is accompanied by their combo consisting of piano, bass and drums.

During their career, the choir has won several prizes, such as "World Champion Jazz" during the World Choir Games in China in 2010. In 2012, they defended this title and were also hailed as  "World Champion Pop" during the World Choir Games in the United States,  defeating many popular choirs from around the world. They again defended this title at the World Choir Games 2014, in Riga.

The vocal group won the title for Best Dutch Vocal Group at both the 2011 and 2013 editions of the BALK TOPfestival, one of the larger choir festivals in the Netherlands. They also gained national fame after it won the first Dutch edition of the popular television show Clash of the Choirs in 2007.

In 2014, Dekoor performed with the Rolling Stones on their 14 On Fire tour for their performances at Pinkpop (NL) and TW Classic (BE).

In October 2014, Dekoor performed with Damien Rice at the Royal Carré Theatre.

In 2016, Dekoor toured throughout the Netherlands with their very first theater production. After this success, they wll bring a new show to the stage in 2017.

In 2016, Dekoor performed at Sziget, a yearly festival in Budapest.

Discography
 Tuesdays (2014)
 Beter dan Ooit (2007)
 Still Crazy (2007)
 Dekoor Close Harmony - Best of 1995 - 2005 (2005)
 Dekoor Close Harmony - Korea (2004)
 A O.K. (2000)
 Rappo Funkin' Voices (1995)

References 

Utrecht University
Dutch choirs
Musical groups established in 1985
1985 establishments in the Netherlands